Girl with Basket of Fruit is the eleventh album by American experimental band Xiu Xiu, released on February 8, 2019. It follows the band's 2017 album Forget and was co-produced by member Angela Seo and Deerhoof's Greg Saunier. The album is supported by the lead single "Scisssssssors", which was released with an accompanying music video. A second single, entitled "Pumpkin Attack on Mommy and Daddy", was also released with a music video on January 15, 2019.

Background and lyrics
The record is said to feature "themes and references" of and to "ritual, mythology, mundane and divergent belief, film, music, and resurrected motifs from preceding Xiu Xiu videos". It was also noted to be "imbued with the agitation, tension, sorrow and anger that has permeated the daily lives of so many over the last few years". The title is a reference to Caravaggio's Boy with a Basket of Fruit, with the gender switch being crucial to the record: "When this title is a boy it is fey and lovely. When it is a girl is worrisome and rife with danger. Male martyrs are almost always surrounded by nurses, their mothers, adoring angels and other loving disciples wrapping their crushed and holy bodies in strips of herb soaked cloth and weeping rapturously. Female martyrs are almost always depicted having their skin flayed, breasts branded or ripped off with tongs or being stabbed and they are always, always alone save for her murderers. There is never anyone by their sides celebrating their spiritual life, only fiendishly reveling in their torture of her. It is perilous to be a 'girl.'"

Jamie Stewart, alongside a selection of images connected to each of the album's songs and Angela Seo's favorite and least-favorite lyrics, wrote of Girl with a Basket of Fruit: "Generally, Xiu Xiu songs are narratives about the internal effects of external events. For this record [...] the lyrics were taken largely from the internal effects of internal events: reactions to and explorations of other people's TEXTS [...] and images."

The cover of the album depicts the sigil of Vetis, The Life Promiser, whose name is referenced in the title track of the album.

Music
Lead single "Scisssssssors" was called "ritualistic-sounding" and its video described as featuring "cult-like imagery" by The Fader.

Reception

Girl with Basket of Fruit received positive reviews from critics. On Metacritic, the album holds a score of 75/100 based on 11 reviews, indicating "generally favorable reviews".

Track listing
All tracks produced by Angela Seo and Greg Saunier. Credits adapted from Tidal.

Personnel
Credits adapted from liner notes.

Xiu Xiu
 Jamie Stewart – vocals, synthesizers, guitar, experimental percussion, viola, recording
 Angela Seo – piano, vocals, electronic percussion, organ, harmonium, production

Additional musicians

 Daniel Brevil – percussion
 Devin Hoff – double bass, bass violin, bass guitar
 Emmanuel Obi – percussion, experimental percussion, vocals
 Ayo Okafor – percussion
 Elliot Reed – percussion, experimental percussion, vocals
 Eugene Robinson – vocals
 Greg Saunier – organ, production
 Ches Smith – percussion
 Ace Stewart – vocals
 River Stewart – vocals

Technical
 John Congleton – mixing
 Lawrence English – mastering
 Tara Jane O'Neil – additional recording

Charts

Notes

References

2019 albums
Xiu Xiu albums
Polyvinyl Record Co. albums